Acetobacteroides is a bacterial genus from the family of Williamwhitmaniaceae with one known species (Acetobacteroides hydrogenigenes).

References

Further reading 
 

Bacteroidia
Monotypic bacteria genera
Bacteria genera